Kazimierz Węgrzyn (born 13 April 1967 in Biłgoraj) is a former Polish footballer (defender). Now he is a football commentator.

Career

Club
During his career he played for such a clubs like Wisła Kraków, Cracovia or GKS Katowice.

International
He played 20 matches for Poland national football team. (1991–1999).

Honors
 The Championship of Poland with Wisła Kraków
 The Polish Cup and Polish Supercup with GKS Katowice

Trivia
 Kazimierz Węgrzyn during his career played for three clubs from Kraków - Hutnik Kraków, Wisła Kraków and Cracovia

External links
 
 

1967 births
Living people
People from Biłgoraj
Polish footballers
Poland international footballers
Association football defenders
Wisła Kraków players
MKS Cracovia (football) players
GKS Katowice players
SV Ried players
Pogoń Szczecin players
Widzew Łódź players
Hutnik Nowa Huta players
Association football commentators
Polish expatriate footballers
Expatriate footballers in Austria
Sportspeople from Lublin Voivodeship